Sven Lüscher (born 5 March 1984) is a Swiss former footballer.

Career 
Lüscher started his career at FC Aarau and played two Nationalliga A games. In 2005–06 season, he scored 12 goals in 28 games for SC Zofingen at 1. Liga (Also within Aargau canton). On 10 July 2006, he was signed by Challenge League side SC Kriens. In May 2008, he signed a two-year contract with Super League side BSC Young Boys on free transfer. He left on 20 January 2009 Bern and moved to FC Winterthur.

References

External links
 
 Profile at Welt Fussball  
 

1984 births
Living people
Swiss men's footballers
FC Aarau players
SC Kriens players
BSC Young Boys players
FC Winterthur players
Swiss Super League players
Swiss Challenge League players
Association football forwards